Peter Sitt (born 7 December 1969) is a German former swimmer who competed in the 1988 Summer Olympics and in the 1992 Summer Olympics.
Today he counts to one of the most successful insurance brokers in Germany.

References

1969 births
Living people
German male swimmers
German male freestyle swimmers
Olympic swimmers of West Germany
Olympic swimmers of Germany
Swimmers at the 1988 Summer Olympics
Swimmers at the 1992 Summer Olympics
World record setters in swimming
World Aquatics Championships medalists in swimming
European Aquatics Championships medalists in swimming